Eugeniu Cociuc (born 11 May 1993) is a Moldovan professional footballer who plays as a midfielder for Armenian Premier League club Pyunik and the Moldova national team.

Career

Club 

Cociuc returned to Žilina after six-months on loan at Sabail at the end of the 2017–18 season.

On 22 August 2018, Cociuc signed contract with Azerbaijan Premier League side Sabail. After leaving Sabail on 15 January 2020, Cociuc signed an 18-month contract with Sabah on 28 January 2020. Cociuc left Sabah by mutual consent on 29 December 2020 having played 12 games for the club. Cociuc then signed for Keşla on 9 February 2021.

On 24 January 2022, Cociuc signed for Pyunik.

Honours

Pyunik 

 Armenian Premier League: 2021–22

MŠK Žilina 

 Fortuna Liga: Winners: 2016–17

References

External links

Profile at FC Dacia Chișinău

1993 births
Footballers from Chișinău
Association football midfielders
Moldovan footballers
Moldovan expatriate footballers
Moldova international footballers
Moldova youth international footballers
Living people
FC Dacia Chișinău players
MŠK Žilina players
Sabail FK players
Sabah FC (Azerbaijan) players
Moldovan Super Liga players
Slovak Super Liga players
Azerbaijan Premier League players
Moldovan expatriate sportspeople in Slovakia
Moldovan expatriate sportspeople in Azerbaijan
Expatriate footballers in Slovakia
Expatriate footballers in Azerbaijan